Mike White is an American softball coach who is the current head coach at Texas.

Coaching career

Oregon
On June 30, 2009, Oregon hired Mike White as head coach of the softball program. In the 2010 season, White led Oregon to their first-ever Super Regional bid by beating the eight seeded Georgia Tech. In 2012, Oregon reached their second-ever Women's College World Series, where they finished 5th among eight teams. In 2013, Mike White led Oregon to their first-ever Pac-12 Conference title. In 2014, Oregon had their best ever season finishing with a program-best 56 wins and advanced to the Women's College World Series. During the 2014 season, Oregon acquired their first ever number 1 ranking and swept rival Washington for the first time. In 2015, Oregon sported a program-best 21 Pac-12 Conference wins in a season, as well as, making the Women's College World Series for the third time in four years. In 2016, Oregon won their 4th straight Pac-12 Conference title. In 2017, Oregon made the Women's College World Series and made it to the semis of WCWS. In 2018, Oregon won their 5th Pac-12 Title, and made the Women's College World Series for the 5th time, as well as, reached 50 wins for the 5th time in program history. After the 2018 season, it was announced that Mike White would accept the softball head coaching job at the University of Texas. Longtime Oklahoma softball assistant coach Melyssa Lombardi would replace White as Oregon Head Softball Coach.

Texas
On June 25, 2018, Texas hired Mike White as head coach of the Texas softball program to replace Connie Clark who was the programs only head coach.

Head coaching record

College

References

Living people
American softball coaches
Central Arizona Vaqueros baseball players
Oklahoma Sooners baseball players
Oregon Ducks softball coaches
Texas Longhorns softball coaches
New Zealand softball players
New Zealand emigrants to the United States
American softball players
Mount Mercy University alumni
1967 births